Alexander Nasim Succar Cañote  (born 12 August 1995) is a Peruvian professional footballer who plays as a striker for Peruvian club Universitario de Deportes.

International career
Succar made his international debut for Peru on 6 June 2017, in a friendly against Paraguay, winning 1–0.

Personal life
Succar is of Lebanese descent and is eligible to be selected for their national team; he's also available to represent the United States due to his father's American nationality. His younger brother, Matías Succar, is also a professional footballer.

In September 2019, Alexander and Matías were contacted by the Lebanese national team to play the 2022 FIFA World Cup qualification due to their Lebanese descent. However, they refused to play for Lebanon.

References

External links
 
 

1995 births
Living people
Footballers from Lima
Association football forwards
Peruvian footballers
Peruvian expatriate footballers
Peru youth international footballers
Peru under-20 international footballers
Peruvian people of Lebanese descent
Sportspeople of Lebanese descent
Sporting Cristal footballers
FC Sion players
Cienciano footballers
C.D. Huachipato footballers
Chilean Primera División players
Peruvian Primera División players
Swiss Super League players
Peruvian expatriates in Chile
Expatriate footballers in Chile
Peruvian expatriate sportspeople in Switzerland
Expatriate footballers in Switzerland